Norma Redpath   (20 November 192812 January 2013) was a prominent Australian sculptor, who worked in Italy and Melbourne.

Early life and education 
Norma Redpath was born on 20 November 1928.

She studied painting from 1942 to 1948 (with a long break due to illness) at the Swinburne Technical College in Hawthorn, and from 1949 to 1951 sculpture at the Royal Melbourne Institute of Technology, both in Melbourne. Her studies there were largely self-directed, as she found no contemporary sculpture of interest to her in Australia.
While still a student, she was invited to be a member of the Victorian Sculptors' Society (VSS) (which in late 1967 disbanded, and was reconstituted as the Association of Sculptors of Victoria (ASV)), where she exhibited, and was later vice-president.

Career 

In 1952, she was teaching at the Korowa Anglican Girls' School and the Melbourne Technical College, and around this time also set up her first self-funded professional sculpture studio.

In 1953 she was a founding member of the "Group of Four" with Inge King, Julius Kane and Clifford Last.

During the 1950s, she travelled to Europe, and studied in Italy from 1956 to 1958 at the Universita per Stranieri in Perugia, developing a love for Italy and Italian art.

In 1958 she returned to Australia to take up a teaching post at the Swinburne Technical College, and became a founding member of the renowned "Centre Five" group of sculptors in 1959, a group which expanded from the Group of Four to add (among others) Lenton Parr, Vincas Jomantas and Teisutis Zikaras, who broke with the VSS and organised private exhibitions. In 1960, she was one of the artists selected for the National Gallery of Victoria's Six Sculptors exhibition, which was the first exhibition of local modernist sculpture by the Gallery.

By 1961 she had decisively turned to bronze, with Dawn figure, a plaster cast envisaged for casting which was awarded the inaugural Mildara (later Mildura) Prize for Sculpture. The same year she won both the Italian Government Travelling Scholarship and the Althea Dyason Bequest travelling scholarship (awarded by the Art Gallery of New South Wales).

In 1962 she pursued her studies at the Accademia di Belle Arti di Brera in Milan, northern Italy, where she would later make a base as she travelled frequently back and forth between Italy and Australia. Sculptures cast there formed the basis of her Gallery A exhibition in Melbourne the following year. One of the sculptures was awarded her second Mildara Prize for Sculpture in 1964, and in 1966 she won the Transfield Prize for Sculpture.

In 1968 she returned to Melbourne, establishing her second studio, in the inner-city suburb of Parkville, where she worked on a number of major commissions.

In 1974, while again in Italy, Redpath married Antonio de Altamer, an Italian naval architect. The worked together to refine the technical procedures of the Fonderia Artistica Battaglia and other foundries in the next decade. From the late 1970s she ceased studio work, instead describing her sculptural ideas in a manuscript, Ideas and Images.

From 1974 to 1985 she lived and worked alternately in her Milanese studio and Melbourne, and from 1985 she returned to Australia with her husband and set up her third Australian sculpture studio, this time in Carlton. Her last show was at the Heide Museum of Modern Art, in 2000.

Recognition 
In 1970 Redpath was appointed an Officer of the Order of the British Empire for services to contemporary sculpture.

In 2006 she was awarded an honorary doctorate from her old college, now Swinburne University.

Later life and legacy 
Redpath's husband died in 2000, the same year as her last show.

After a long illness, she died in Melbourne in 2013, aged 84.

Her Carlton studio and home is owned by the University of Melbourne, and is now available to artists and academics. It is managed by the Centre of Visual Art, and is able to be visited. Residencies of varying lengths of time are offered to artists, writers and researchers to develop new work as well as engage with the local workers in related fields.

Selected works 
Areopagitica (1958), Baillieu Library, University of Melbourne
Bronze Reliefs (1964), BP Administration Building, Crib Point, Victoria – relocated to BP building South Melbourne, relocated again to the McClelland Gallery and Sculpture Park in 1997. (image and details)
Treasury Fountain (1965–1969), Treasury Building, Canberra (ACT) – a two-piece bronze fountain in a rectangular granite pond.
Victoria Coats of Arms (1968), above entrance, National Gallery of Victoria, Melbourne– a bronze relief
Sculpture Column (1969–1972), Reserve Bank of Australia, Brisbane
Facade Relief (1970–1972), Victorian College of Pharmacy, Parkville, Melbourne
Sydney Rubbo Memorial Capital (1970–1973), Microbiology and Immunology Building Courtyard, University of Melbourne
Higuchi Sculpture (1971–1972), Manning Building at the Monash University in Melbourne – unveiled by Dr. Takeru Higuchi details in pdf document page 6
Extended Column (1972–1975), Canberra School of Music, Canberra
Paesaggio Cariatide (Carrying the Landscape) (1980–1985), undercroft of State Bank Centre, Bourke Street, in Melbourne – since 2003 at the McClelland Gallery and Sculpture Park in Langwarrin, Victoria

References

Further reading 
Eckett, Jane. Man sights an object in space: Norma Redpath's approach to public art, in Art Monthly Australasia, Issue 259, May 2013, pages 62–64.

External links 

 Website Charles Nodrum Gallery: Biography and some works
 Norma Redpath interviewed by Hazel de Berg in the Hazel de Berg collection – audio recording

1928 births
2013 deaths
20th-century Australian sculptors
20th-century Australian women artists
21st-century Australian women artists
21st-century Australian artists
Artists from Melbourne
Australian Officers of the Order of the British Empire
Australian painters
Swinburne University of Technology alumni
RMIT University alumni